Motovun (or Montona d'Istria) is a village and a municipality in central Istria, Croatia. In ancient times, both Celts and Illyrians built their fortresses at the location of present-day Motovun. The name of the village is also of Celtic origin, derived from Montona, meaning "a town in the hills". The population of the village itself is 531, with a total of 983 residents in the municipality (2001); 192 of the residents speak Italian as their mother tongue. The Parenzana, a narrow-gauge railroad that ran from Trieste to Poreč/Parenzo between 1902 and 1935, passed below the town.

Description

Motovun is a medieval town that grew up on the site of an ancient city called Castellieri. On the inner walls are several coats-of-arms of different Motovun ruling families and two gravestones of Roman inhabitants (dating from the 1st century).

In the 10th and 11th centuries it belonged to the Bishop of Poreč. From 1278 it was taken over by Venice and surrounded by solid walls which are still intact today, and used as a walkway with unique views over the four corners of Istria. The three parts of the town are connected by a system of internal and external fortifications with towers and city gates containing elements of Romanesque, Gothic and Renaissance styles, built between the 14th and 17th centuries. It is a typical example of Venetian colonial architecture.

Parish Church of St. Stephen (Sveti Stjepan)

The late-Renaissance church of St. Stephen was built at the beginning of the 17th century from sketches probably designed by the well-known Renaissance architect Andrea Palladio (1508–1580). The church contains several works of art: the marble statues of St. Stephen and St. Laurence by Francesco Bonazzo and the 17th-century painting of the Last Supper over the altar by an unknown Venetian artist. The water cisterns in the square in front of the church date from the 14th and 15th centuries.

The forest of Motovun/Montona
This area differs completely not only from the nearby forests, but also from those of the entire surrounding karst region because of its wildlife, moist soil and prized black and white truffles (Tuber magnatum), which grow successfully there. Since this fungus grows underground, it is gathered with the aid of specially trained dogs.

The most common tree in the forest is the English or brown oak (Quercus robur). To preserve natural conditions for the development of the Motovun forest, the protected area is occasionally flooded, even though the River Mirna is controlled and its entire valley protected from flooding.

On the slopes of the hill, grapes for famous Istrian wines are grown: the Teran and the Malvazija wine.

The legend of Veli Jože
Motovun is known among today's population of Istria as the city of Veli Jože, the good gentle giant, written by the nationalist Vladimir Nazor, one of the most important Croatian writers of the 20th century. The story was based on local folktales as a response to the national struggles of the Croats for equality with the politically dominant ethnic German and Italian community (1900–1914). The tale is known today throughout Croatia, while the character of Veli Jože (Big Joe) is quite correctly linked with the city.

The city today

Since 1999, Motovun has hosted the international Motovun Film Festival for independent and avant-garde films from the U.S. and Europe.

The biggest current local issue is the battle between foreign developers, who have proposed two 18-hole golf courses and a 500+-bed resort in the valley below the town, extending the existing 9-hole course and some of the local community, who are opposed to the proposals because of objections against the real estate speculation around the project, rejection of 123 building sites for villas in the protected natural environment and concerns about possible damage to their truffles growing on the other side of the river. The community is divided on the issue, as many welcome the development as a year-round aid to jobs and local tourist revenues.  An environmental impact study has now been completed.

Motovun's ground plan was depicted on the reverse of the Croatian 10 kuna banknote, issued in 1993, 1995, 2001 and 2004.

Notable residents
Motovun was the birthplace of racing driver Mario Andretti and his twin brother Aldo in 1940. The brothers raced hand-crafted wooden cars through the steep streets. After World War II Istria became a part of Croatia, a sovereign constituent unit of Yugoslavia. His family, like many other ethnic Italians, emigrated. They lived in a camp near Lucca from 1948 to 1955. The Andretti family resettled in Nazareth, Pennsylvania, United States.
Motovun was also the birthplace in 1495 of prominent Renaissance Italian music printer Andrea Antico, famous as the inventor of the first movable wooden types for printing musical scores. He started publishing in Rome in 1510 and after obtaining a patent from Pope Leo X he published polyphonic music and music for organ.

See also
 Veli Jože (novel)
 Tentative list of World Heritage Sites in Croatia
 Motovune, Americana Acoustic Rock band from Waukegan, Illinois

Notes
The Statute of Motovun

References

External links

 Motovun Film Festival
 Motovun Eco Town

Municipalities of Croatia
Populated places in Istria County
Italian-speaking territorial units in Croatia